Caryn Mandabach is a U.K.-based American television producer. Mandabach is responsible for producing US hits considered ground-breaking, such as The Cosby Show, Roseanne, 3rd Rock from the Sun (1997–2001), That '70s Show (1998–2004) and Nurse Jackie. In the U.K. she owns and produces the BAFTA award-winning series Peaky Blinders, currently broadcasting its sixth season for the BBC and Netflix.

In addition to the BAFTA, Mandabach has won a Royal Television Society award and an Emmy. She has been honoured for her work by the Producers Guild, Women in Film, and the Hollywood Radio and Television Society, among others. Mandabach owns and operates CMP UK, currently producing Peaky Blinders. She divides her time between London and Dorset, where she resides with her husband, Kenneth Bolan.

Mandabach was quoted in a 2018 interview with Industrial Scripts stating that one of the reasons for the move was ownership. "I own Peaky Blinders, and I own my own company. I used to own, with my partners, bits of all my other shows. But in the United States there are no owners any more, it's all corporate."

References

External links

In Conversation with Caryn Mandabach, BAFTA event video

American television producers
American women television producers
Living people
Washington University in St. Louis alumni
Year of birth missing (living people)